j US t (pronounced "just us") is the 12th studio album by Faust, released in 2014.

The band released the album in a "foundational" state, hoping that listeners would use the tracks to construct new music.

Critical reception
The Aquarian called the album "a beautiful journey into experimental music," writing that it "just goes to show you that even with 40 years of experience, Faust is still able to break new musical ground."

Track listing

References

2014 albums
Faust (band) albums